The European and African Zone is one of the three zones of regional Davis Cup competition in 2009.

In the European and African Zone there are four different groups in which teams compete against each other to advance to the next group.

Participating teams

Draw

 and  relegated to Group II in 2010.

First Round Matches

South Africa vs. Macedonia

Second Round Matches

Slovakia vs. Italy

Belarus vs. South Africa

Ukraine vs. Great Britain

Poland vs. Belgium

First Round Play-offs Matches

Belarus vs. Macedonia

Second Round Play-offs Matches

Slovakia vs. Macedonia

Great Britain vs. Poland

External links
Davis Cup draw details

Group I